Leonid Arkadievich Desyatnikov (born: 16 October 1955, Kharkiv, Ukrainian SSR) is a Russian composer who first made a reputation with a number of film scores, then achieving greater fame when his controversial opera The Children of Rosenthal was premiered at the Bolshoi Theatre in Moscow.

Life and career
Leonid Desyatnikov was born in 1955 in Kharkiv, Ukraine. He is a graduate of the Leningrad Conservatory, where he studied composition and instrumentation. Desyatnikov has penned four opera, several cantatas and numerous vocal and instrumental compositions. His principal compositions include: The Children of Rosenthal (an opera in two acts; libretto, Vladimir Sorokin), commissioned by the Bolshoi Theatre; Poor Liza (a chamber opera in one act; libretto, Leonid Desyatnikov, after the novel by Nikolai Karamzin); Gift (a cantata based on the verses of Gavrila Derzhavin); The Leaden Echo (a work for voice(s) and instruments based on the poem by Gerard Manley Hopkins); and The Rite of Winter 1949 (a symphony for chorus, soloists and orchestra).

Desyatnikov has been collaborating with Gidon Kremer since 1996 as a composer (Wie der Alte Leiermann...; the chamber version of Sketches to Sunset; Russian Seasons) as well as arranging the works of Astor Piazzolla, including the tango-operita María de Buenos Aires and the tango suite Cuatro estaciones porteñas. Desyatnikov wrote the scores for the films Sunset (1990), Lost in Siberia (1991), Hammer and Sickle (1994), Moscow Nights (Katya Izmailova) (1994), Giselle’s Mania (1995), Prisoner of the Mountains (1996), All That Is Tender (1996), Moscow (2000), His Wife’s Diary (2000) and The Target (2010).

Awards
Desyatnikov was awarded a Golden Ram prize and the Grand Prix of the IV International Cinema Music festival in Bonn for his score for Moscow and the special prize of the Window to Europe Cinema Festival in Vyborg. In 2006 the opera The Children of Rosenthal received the special jury prize of The Golden Mask National Theatre Award. In 2003 Desyatnikov was awarded the State Prize of Russia.

Work
Desyatnikov is the author of four operas, the symphony The Rite of Winter 1949, vocal cycles to the poems of Rilke and the OBERIU poets, and several instrumental transcriptions of themes by Ástor Piazzolla. The style of his music is defined by the composer himself as "an emancipation of consonance, transformation of banality and 'minimalism' with a human face". His favourite genre is "a tragically naughty bagatelle".

Opera
Poor Liza (Бедная Лиза) one-act chamber opera, libretto by Leonid Desyatnikov after Nikolai Karamzin (1976; 1980)
Nobody Wants to Sing or Bravo-bravissimo,  Pioneer Anisimov (Никто не хочет петь, или Браво-брависсимо, пионер Анисимов a comic opera for children in two acts, libretto by B. Chaban (1982)
Vitamin of the Growth (Витамин роста) one-act classical opera for children, for the soloists and piano after the poem by Oleg Grigoriev  (1985)
The Children of Rosenthal (Дети Розенталя) opera in two acts, libretto by Vladimir Sorokin. Commissioned by the Bolshoi Theatre, premiere March 23, 2005

Chamber music
Variations on the Obtaining of a Dwelling for violoncello and piano. 
Wie Der Alte Leiermann  for violin and piano
Du côté de chez Swan for two pianos
Sketches to Sunset, quintet for flute, clarinet, violin, double bass and piano  
Return for oboe, clarinet, two violins, viola, cello and tape

Other genres
Gift (Dar), after Gavrila Derzhavin
Liebe und Leben des Dichters, a vocal cycle to the poems by Daniil Kharms and Nikolay Oleynikov
The Leaden Echo, for voice(s) and instruments after Gerard Manley Hopkins,
Russian Seasons for voice, solo violin and strings

Music for symphony orchestra
, a symphony for chorus, soloists and orchestra.
Sketches to Sunset for orchestra

Ballet

Film music
Sunset ("Закат", Zeldovich, 1990)
Lost in Siberia ("Затерянный в Сибири", 1991, Mitta)
Katia Izmailova (Moscow nights) ("Подмосковные вечера", Todorovsky, 1994)
Hammer and Sickle ("Серп и молот", Livnev, 1994)
Giselle's Mania ("Мания Жизели", Uchitel, 1995)
The Prisoner of the Mountains ("Кавказский пленник", Bodrov, 1996)
Whoever Softer ("Тот, кто нежнее", Karpykov, 1996)
His Wife's Diary (Uchitel, 2000) 
Moscow ("Москва", Zeldovich, 2000)
Tycoon ("Олигарх", Loungine, 2002)
Dreaming of Space ("Космос как предчувствие", Uchitel, 2005)
Captive ("Пленный", Uchitel, 2008)
Target ("Мишень", Zeldovich, 2011)
Van Goghs ("Ван Гоги", Livnev, 2019)

References

External links
Portrait CD on Quartz
Two Mozarts
Review
Scandal in Bolshoi
Loyal children
Not art, but pathology
The rest is noise
Autobiography, works, publications (in Russian)
Interview 2003 (in Russian)
Interview 2004 (in Russian)
Interview 2005 (in Russian)

Russian male classical composers
Russian opera composers
Male opera composers
1955 births
Living people
Russian ballet composers
21st-century classical composers
20th-century classical composers
Musicians from Kharkiv
Saint Petersburg Conservatory alumni
20th-century Russian male musicians
21st-century Russian male musicians